John Gilchrist (born 24 April 1932) is an English former cricketer. He played four first-class matches for Bengal between 1957 and 1958.

See also
 List of Bengal cricketers

References

External links
 

1932 births
Living people
English cricketers
Bengal cricketers
Cricketers from South Shields
Cricketers from County Durham